Awosika is a surname. Notable people with the surname include:

Ajoritsedere Awosika (born  1953), Nigerian banker
Ibukun Awosika (born 1962), Nigerian business woman, author, and motivational speaker
Kayode Awosika (born 1998), Nigerian American football player